Timeline of temperature and pressure measurement technology. A history of temperature measurement and pressure measurement technology.

Timeline

1500s
 1592–1593 — Galileo Galilei builds a device showing variation of hotness known as the thermoscope using the contraction of air to draw water up a tube.

1600s
 1612 — Santorio Sanctorius makes the first thermometer for medical use
 1617 — Giuseppe Biancani published the first clear diagram of a thermoscope
 1624 — The word thermometer (in its French form) first appeared in La Récréation Mathématique by Jean Leurechon, who describes one with a scale of 8 degrees.
 1629 — Joseph Solomon Delmedigo describes in a book an accurate sealed-glass thermometer that uses brandy
 1638 — Robert Fludd the first thermoscope showing a scale and thus constituting a thermometer.
 1643 — Evangelista Torricelli invents the mercury barometer
 1654 — Ferdinando II de' Medici, Grand Duke of Tuscany, made sealed tubes part filled with alcohol, with a bulb and stem, the first modern-style thermometer, depending on the expansion of a liquid, and independent of air pressure
 1695 — Guillaume Amontons improved the thermometer

1700s

 1701 — Newton publishes a method of determining the rate of heat loss of a body and introduces a scale, which had 0 degrees represent the freezing point of water, and 12 degrees for human body temperature.
 1701 — Ole Christensen Rømer made one of the first practical thermometers. As a temperature indicator it used red wine. (Rømer scale), The temperature scale used for his thermometer had 0 representing the temperature of a salt and ice mixture (at about 259 s).
 1709 — Daniel Gabriel Fahrenheit constructed alcohol thermometers which were reproducible (i.e. two would give the same temperature)
 1714 — Daniel Gabriel Fahrenheit invents the mercury-in-glass thermometer giving much greater precision (4 x that of Rømer). Using Rømer's zero point and an upper point of blood temperature, he adjusted the scale so the melting point of ice was 32 and the upper point 96, meaning that the difference of 64 could be got by dividing the intervals into 2 repeatedly.
 1731 — René Antoine Ferchault de Réaumur produced a scale in which 0 represented the freezing point of water and 80 represented the boiling point.  This was chosen as his alcohol mixture expanded 80 parts per thousand.  He did not consider pressure.
 1738 — Daniel Bernoulli asserted in Hydrodynamica the principle that as the speed of a moving fluid increases, the pressure within the fluid decreases. (Kinetic theory)
 1742 — Anders Celsius proposed a temperature scale in which 100 represented the temperature of melting ice  and 0 represented the boiling point of water at a particular pressure.
 1743 — Jean-Pierre Christin had worked independently of Celsius and developed a scale where zero represented the melting point of ice and 100 represented the boiling point but did not specify a pressure. 
 1744 — Carl Linnaeus suggested reversing the temperature scale of Anders Celsius so that 0 represented the freezing point of water and 100 represented the boiling point.
 1782 — James Six invents the Maximum minimum thermometer

1800s
 1821 — Thomas Johann Seebeck invents the thermocouple
 1844 — Lucien Vidi invents the aneroid Barograph
 1845 — Francis Ronalds invents the first successful Barograph based on photography 
 1848 — Lord Kelvin (William Thomson) – Kelvin scale, in his paper, On an Absolute Thermometric Scale
 1849 — Eugène Bourdon – Bourdon_gauge (manometer)
 1849 — Henri Victor Regnault – Hypsometer
 1864 — Henri Becquerel suggests an optical pyrometer
 1866 — Thomas Clifford Allbutt invented a clinical thermometer that produced a body temperature reading in five minutes as opposed to twenty.
 1871 — William Siemens describes the Resistance thermometer at the Bakerian Lecture
 1874 — Herbert McLeod invents the McLeod gauge
 1885 — Calender-Van Duesen invented the platinum resistance temperature device
 1887 — Richard Assmann invents the psychrometer (Wet and Dry Bulb Thermometers)
 1892 — Henri-Louis Le Châtelier builds the first optical pyrometer
 1896 — Samuel Siegfried Karl Ritter von Basch introduced the Sphygmomanometer  to measure blood pressure

1900s
 1906 — Marcello Pirani – Pirani gauge (to measure pressures in vacuum systems)
 1915 — J.C. Stevens — Chart recorder (first chart recorder for environmental monitoring) 
 1924 — Irving Langmuir — Langmuir probe (to measure plasma parameters)
 1930 — Samuel Ruben invented the thermistor

See also
History of thermodynamic temperature
Timeline of heat engine technology
List of timelines

References

Temperature And Pressure Measurement
 
 
History of measurement

es:Termómetro#Los termómetros a través del tiempo